Luis Carlos Santiago Zabaleta (born 5 September 1946 in Rentería, Guipúzcoa) is a Spanish basketball player. He competed in the men's tournament at the 1968 Summer Olympics.

References

External links
 
 
 
 

1946 births
Living people
Spanish men's basketball players
Olympic basketball players of Spain
Basketball players at the 1968 Summer Olympics
People from Errenteria
Sportspeople from Gipuzkoa
Basketball players from the Basque Country (autonomous community)